The following is a list of alleged and confirmed assassinations reported to have been conducted by the State of Israel. It includes attempts on notable persons who were reported to have been specifically targeted by the various Israeli security, intelligence and law enforcement agencies.

According to Eyal Weizman, "targeted assassinations have become the most significant and frequent form of Israeli military attack", and serve not only to contain terror but as a "political tool" to control Palestinian territories Israel has otherwise withdrawn from. In response to protests over the number of civilians killed in targeting operations, and the refusal of a number of pilots to engage in such missions in 2003, Israel set up groups to minimize collateral damage in 2003 to establish acceptable levels of damage to bystanders. In 2006 "focused lethality munitions", missiles with intense but highly localized explosives were introduced to this end, and in November a legal committee was set up to rule on assassinations. 

There is no clear definition of "targeted killing" under international law. The Supreme Court of Israel, in response to a suit on the practice, mainly regarded actions in the Palestinian Territories, ruled on 14 December 2006 that such actions took place in an 'international armed conflict' but that the "terrorists", as civilians, lacked combatant status under international law. Yet they were, in the court's view, civilians participating directly in hostilities, which would mean they lose their immunity. It also ruled, following a precedent set forth by the European Court of Human Rights in its McCann and Others v United Kingdom judgement, that a 'law of proportionality', balancing military necessity with humanity, must apply. Assassinations were permitted if "strong and persuasive information" concerning the target's identity existed; if the mission served to curtail terror; and if other techniques, such as attempting to arrest the target, would gravely endanger soldiers' lives.

Nils Melzer in his 2006 study Targeted Killing in International Law defines targeted killings in terms of five criteria, summed up as "the use of lethal force attributable to a subject of international law with the intent, premeditation and deliberation to kill individually selected persons who are not in the physical custody of those targeting them." Before 2001 Israel denied it practiced or has a policy of conducting extrajudicial executions.

The term itself gained widespread currency only after Israel went public concerning its policy regarding alleged terrorists in the Palestinian territories. Early into the Second Intifada, it became the first state to publicly outline a policy of “liquidation” and “preemptive targeted killing,” when two female bystanders were killed during an operation to kill a Palestinian militant, Hussein ‘Abayat, on 9 November 2000. Killings in the past were often premised on revenge for earlier crimes and required a quasi-judicial commission to convict the target of culpability before action was taken. The policy, re-introduced by Ariel Sharon in the face of suicide bombings, no longer took evidence of potential involvement by the target in future attacks on Israel as decisive, and the decision was left to the discretion of the Prime Minister and Shin Bet.

According to the former Legal Advisor to the State Department Judge Abraham Sofaer:

...killings in self-defense are no more "assassinations" in international affairs than they are murders when undertaken by our police forces against domestic killers. Targeted killings in self-defense have been authoritatively determined by the federal government to fall outside the assassination prohibition. 
A state engaged in such activities must, however, Sofaer concluded, openly acknowledge its responsibility and accept accountability for mistakes made.

This characterization is criticized by many, including Amnesty International.

B'tselem has calculated that between 2002 and May 2008, at least 387 Palestinians died as a result of Israeli targeted killings, of which 234 were the targets, and the rest collateral casualties.  The majority of Israeli targeted killings have taken place in Area A of the West Bank lying within the jurisdiction of the Palestinian National Authority. Some of the killings listed below have been denied by Israel. Most fall within a series of campaigns, including Operation Wrath of God (launched in response to the 1972 Munich massacre), Israeli actions in the wake of the al-Aqsa Intifada (2000–), and strikes during the 2008–09 Gaza War. Gaza, according to Eyal Weizman, has now become 'the world's largest laboratory for airborne assassinations.' According to reports, as part of the long-term cease-fire terms negotiated between Israel, Hamas and other Palestinian groups to end the 2014 Israel–Gaza conflict, Israel pledged it would desist from its targeted killings against Palestinian terrorists and faction leaders.

The policy of targeted killings is known in Hebrew as "focused foiling" (Hebrew: סיכול ממוקד sikul memukad).

1950s

1960s

1970s
{| class="wikitable sortable"
|-
! style="width:8%;"|Date
! style="width:8%;"|Place
! style="width:8%;"|Country
! style="width:18%;"|Target
! style="width:20%;"|Description
!Action
! style="width:12%;"|Killer
|-
|July 8, 1972
|rowspan=2|Beirut
|rowspan=2|
|Ghassan Kanafani
|Palestinian writer and a leading member of the PFLP, who had claimed responsibility for the Lod Airport massacre on behalf of the PFLP.
|Killed by car bomb.
|rowspan=6|Mossad
|-
|July 25, 1972
|Attempted killing of Bassam Abu Sharif
|Popular Front for the Liberation of Palestine Information Office. He held a press conference with Ghassan Kanafani during the Dawson's Field hijackings justifying the PFLP's actions.
|He lost four fingers, and was left deaf in one ear and blind in one eye, after a book sent to him that was implanted with a bomb exploded in his hands.
|-
|October 16, 1972
|Rome
|
|Abdel Wael Zwaiter
|Libyan embassy employee, cousin of Yassir Arafat, PLO representative, poet and multilingual translator, considered by Israel to be a terrorist for his alleged role in the Black September group and the Munich massacre, though Aaron Klein  states that 'uncorroborated and improperly cross-referenced intelligence information tied him to a support group' for Black September.
|Shot 12 times by two Mossad gunmen as he waited for an elevator to his apartment near Piazza Avellino.
|-
|December 8, 1972
|Paris
|
|Mahmoud Hamshari
|PLO representative in France and coordinator of the Munich Olympic Games massacre.
|Killed by bomb concealed in his telephone.
|-
|January 24, 1973
|Nicosia
|
|Hussein Al Bashir a.k.a. Hussein Abu-Khair/Hussein Abad.
|Fatah representative in Nicosia, Cyprus and PLO liaison officer with the KGB.
|Killed by bomb in his hotel room bed.
|-
|April 6, 1973
|Paris
|
|Basil Al-Kubaissi
|PFLP member and American University of Beirut Professor of International Law
|Killed on a street in Paris by two Mossad agents.
|-
|rowspan=3|April 9, 1973
|rowspan=3|Beirut
|rowspan=3|
|Kamal Adwan
|Black September commander and member of the Fatah central committee
|Killed in his apartment in front of his children during Operation Spring of Youth, either shot 55 times or killed with a grenade.
|Sayeret Matkal led by Ehud Barak
|-
|Muhammad Youssef Al-Najjar
|Black September Operations officer and PLO official
|Shot dead in his apartment together with his wife during Operation Spring of Youth.
|Sayeret Matkal together with Mossad.
|-
|Kamal Nasser
|Palestinian Christian poet, advocate of non-violence and PLO spokesman
|Shot dead in his apartment during Operation Spring of Youth. According to Palestinian sources his body was left as if hanging from a cross. A woman neighbour was shot dead when she opened her door during the operation.
|Sayeret Matkal
|-
|April 11, 1973
|Athens
|
|Zaiad Muchasi
|Fatah representative to Cyprus
|Killed in hotel room.
|rowspan=6|Mossad<ref>Blake W. Mobley, Terrorism and Counterintelligence: How Terrorist Groups Elude Detection Terrorism and Counterintelligence: How Terrorist Groups Elude Detection,] Columbia University Press, 2012 p.91.</ref>Anthony H. Cordesman, Peace and War: The Arab-Israeli Military Balance Enters the 21st Century, Greenwood Publishing 2002 p.324.
|-
|June 28, 1973
|Paris
|
|Mohammad Boudia
|Black September operations officer
|Killed by pressure-activated mine under his car seat.
|-
|July 21, 1973
|Lillehammer
|
|Attempted killing of Ali Hassan Salameh
|High-ranked leader in the PLO and Black September who was behind the 1972 Munich Olympic Games massacre
|Ahmed Bouchiki, an innocent waiter believed to be Ali Hassan Salameh, killed by gunmen.  Known as the Lillehammer affair.
|-
|March 27, 1978
|East Berlin
|
|Wadie Haddad
|PFLP commander, who masterminded several plane hijackings in the 1960s and 1970s.
|He apparently died of cancer in an East Berlin hospital, reportedly untraced by Mossad. Mossad never claimed responsibility. Aaron Klein states that Mossad passed on through a Palestinian contact a gift of chocolates laced with a slow poison, which effectively caused his death several months later.
|-
|January 22, 1979
|Beirut
|
|Ali Hassan Salameh
|High-ranked leader in the PLO and Black September who was behind the 1972 Munich Olympic Games massacre
|Killed by a remote-controlled car bomb, along with four bodyguards and four innocent bystanders.
|}

1980s

1990s

2000s
 2000, September 29–2001, April 25. According to Palestinian sources, the IDF assassinated 13 political activists in Area A under full Palestinian Authority, with 9 civilian casualties.
 2001 Israel killed 35 suspected Palestinian militants.
 2002 Israel killed 72 suspected militants.2003 (August) The Israeli government authorized the killing of Hamas's entire political leadership in Gaza, 'without further notice,' in a method called 'the hunting season' in order to strengthen the position of moderates and Mahmoud Abbas.
 2005''' In February Israel announced a suspension of targeted killings, while reserving the right to kill allegedly 'ticking bombs'.

2010s

2020s

See also
Targeted killings by Israel Defense Forces Targeted Killing in International Law'' (2008)
Folke Bernadotte
List of Mossad operations

References

Lists of assassinations
Israeli Security Forces
Assassinations
Israeli–Palestinian conflict-related lists
Targeted killing
Assassinations

he:סיכול ממוקד#פלסטינים שחוסלו בסיכול ממוקד